Makahika is a rural locality in the Horowhenua District of the Manawatū-Whanganui region of New Zealand's North Island.  It is located in the Makahika Stream valley. The stream runs southwest from the Tararua Range to join the Ōhau River.

The Mangahao Makahika Track is a 15 km tramping track through the Tararua Range which takes 6-8 hours one-way depending on direction.

Glamping accommodation is available at Arete Village, part of the Makahika Outdoor Pursuits Centre.

Demographics

Makahika had a population of 960 at the 2018 New Zealand census, an increase of 102 people (11.9%) since the 2013 census, and an increase of 153 people (19.0%) since the 2006 census. There were 372 households. There were 504 males and 456 females, giving a sex ratio of 1.11 males per female. The median age was 50.6 years (compared with 37.4 years nationally), with 138 people (14.4%) aged under 15 years, 138 (14.4%) aged 15 to 29, 495 (51.6%) aged 30 to 64, and 189 (19.7%) aged 65 or older.

Ethnicities were 91.9% European/Pākehā, 11.9% Māori, 2.5% Pacific peoples, 2.5% Asian, and 1.9% other ethnicities (totals add to more than 100% since people could identify with multiple ethnicities).

The proportion of people born overseas was 16.2%, compared with 27.1% nationally.

Although some people objected to giving their religion, 56.2% had no religion, 33.4% were Christian, 0.3% were Buddhist and 1.9% had other religions.

Of those at least 15 years old, 138 (16.8%) people had a bachelor or higher degree, and 168 (20.4%) people had no formal qualifications. The median income was $30,000, compared with $31,800 nationally. The employment status of those at least 15 was that 372 (45.3%) people were employed full-time, 150 (18.2%) were part-time, and 21 (2.6%) were unemployed.

References

Populated places in Manawatū-Whanganui
Horowhenua District